Primm (formerly known as State Line) is an unincorporated community in Clark County, Nevada, United States, primarily notable for its position straddling Interstate 15 where it crosses the state border between California and Nevada. It sits on Ivanpah Dry Lake, which extends to the north and south of town.

It was previously known by the name of State Line, but was renamed in 1996 to avoid confusion with Stateline in northern Nevada. It is named after the original developer of the town, Ernest Jay Primm.

The community's economy is based on its three casinos (the Primm Valley Resorts), which attract gamblers from Southern California wanting to stop before reaching Las Vegas  to the north, or as a last chance to gamble before leaving Nevada. Most of Primm's residents are employees of the casinos. In reverse, a 'lotto store' on the southwestern part of the development within California sells California State Lottery tickets and games, including the multi-state Mega Millions and Powerball games mainly to residents of the Silver State, as Nevada constitutionally prohibits a state lottery.

While not a census-designated place, the 2000 census population for the community is 436.  A Clark County Comprehensive Planning Department estimate placed the population at 284 on July 1, 2006, apparently using different boundaries for the area. In a December 5, 2007 article in the Las Vegas Review-Journal, Primm's population is listed as around 1,132.

For 2020, Census Block 2156, Census Tract 57.03 and Block 2155, Census Tract 57.03 showed a total population of 650.

Primm used to have its own post office on the north side of town, but that has been replaced. All U.S. mail addresses serving Primm (ZIP code 89019) were given Jean addresses and are now served out of the Jean post office.

History
In the 1920s Pete MacIntyre owned a gas station at the state line, on a road later designated U.S. 91. MacIntyre apparently had a difficult time making ends meet selling gas, so he resorted to bootlegging. Primm history remembers him as "Whiskey Pete". When he died in 1933, legend has it that he wanted to be buried standing up with a bottle of bootleg in his hands so he could watch over the area. Whiskey Pete's unmarked grave was accidentally exhumed while workers were building a connecting bridge from Whiskey Pete's to Buffalo Bill's Hotel and Casino (on the other side of I-15). The body was moved and is now said to be buried in one of the caves where MacIntyre cooked up his moonshine.

Dale Hamilton owned State Line from the early 1950s to the early 1970s as U.S. 91 was upgraded to Interstate 15. After he bought the property, he built a Chevron station, a building containing a small slots casino and a small cafe-lunch counter. He also built a small automotive garage and a towing service. He called the business simply "State Line Bar:Slots". Hamilton also campaigned legislators in Carson City to grant an Interstate 15 interchange to the site, which was not originally planned.

In 2004, under the then-ownership of MGM Mirage, 52 apartment buildings were constructed in Primm to serve as housing for employees at the three casinos. The name of the apartment complex is the Desert Oasis, and its address is 355 E. Primm Boulevard.

Climate
Primm's climate is a hot desert climate (Köppen climate classification: BWh).

Events
In 1996, SCORE International started hosting an annual off-road race known as Terrible's SCORE Primm 300. The Primm 300 is one in a series of annual off-road races that include the Baja 1000, Baja 500, San Felipe 250 and the Laughlin Desert Challenge.

In 1997, the 20th World's Strongest Man competition was held in Primm.

Primm was the end location for the 2004 DARPA Grand Challenge. Additionally, it was the starting and ending location for the 2005 DARPA Grand Challenge. The $2 million prize was won by a team from Stanford University.

The Stateline Supermoto Challenge also takes place at Buffalo Bill's casino every year attracting pro and amateur supermoto racers from around the country.

Primm is the location of the Mint 400, the American off-road race.

Primm is the location of WORCS, (World Off Road Championship) of two to four rounds of Motocross, UTV, Side by Side and ATV off-road racing.

Primm is where Simon Lizotte set the Flying Disc Distance World Record at 263.2 m (863.5 ft) on October 25, 2014. He used a 157-gram Innova Blizzard Champion Boss.

Bonnie and Clyde Getaway Car 
Primm is home to the Bonnie and Clyde Getaway Car, the vehicle that Bonnie Parker and Clyde Barrow were in when they were shot and killed after being pursued by the police. It was previously located inside Whiskey Pete's, but was moved to the connecting annex between the Prizm Outlet Mall & Primm Valley Hotel & Casino in 2022.

The couple was shot and killed in Gibsland, Louisiana, almost 1500 miles from Primm.

Media

Primm makes an appearance in the 2010 Obsidian Entertainment video game, Fallout: New Vegas.

References

External links

 Primm, but not proper
 Barstow - Primm, NV trail ride. How to get from Barstow to Primm off road.

 
1920s establishments in Nevada
Ivanpah Valley
Populated places established in the 1920s
Populated places in the Mojave Desert
Unincorporated communities in Clark County, Nevada